The 2013–14 Dempo S.C. season is the club's 46th season since their formation in 1967 and their 16th season ever in the I-League, India's top football league.

Background

Transfers

In:

 

Out:

Federation Cup

Group stage
Group D

Semi-final

References

Dempo SC seasons
Dempo